Ole Rückbrodt (born 17 May 1983 in Lübeck) is a German rower. He won the gold medal in the men's lightweight coxless pair at the 2006 World Rowing Championships.

References
 

1983 births
Living people
German male rowers
Sportspeople from Lübeck
World Rowing Championships medalists for Germany